Karpovsky is a rural locality (a khutor) in Bocharovskoye Rural Settlement, Novoanninsky District, Volgograd Oblast, Russia. The population was 73 as of 2010.

Geography 
Karpovsky is located 35 km southwest of Novoanninsky (the district's administrative centre) by road. Krasny Oktyabr is the nearest rural locality.

References 

Rural localities in Novoanninsky District